Bambam (also: Pitu Ulunna Salu) is an Austronesian language of West Sulawesi, Indonesia. It is spoken in the Mambi and Tabang districts of Mamasa Regency, and in the Matangnga district of Polewali Mandar Regency. Together with Aralle-Tabulahan, Ulumanda', Pannei and Dakka, Bambam belongs to the Pitu Ulunna Salu languages, which form a subbranch within the Northern branch of the South Sulawesi subgroup.

Phonology

'child'.

References

Further reading

Languages of Sulawesi
South Sulawesi languages